In thermodynamics, the cryoscopic constant, relates molality to freezing point depression (which is a colligative property). It is the ratio of the latter to the former:

  is the van ‘t Hoff factor, the number of particles the solute splits into or forms when dissolved. 
  is the molality of the solution.

Through cryoscopy, a known constant can be used to calculate an unknown molar mass. The term "cryoscopy" comes from Greek and means "freezing measurement." Freezing point depression is a colligative property, so  depends only on the number of solute particles dissolved, not the nature of those particles. Cryoscopy is related to ebullioscopy, which determines the same value from the ebullioscopic constant (of boiling point elevation).

  is the ideal gas constant
  is the molar mass of the solvent in kg mol−1
  is the freezing point of the pure solvent in kelvins
  represents the molar enthalpy of fusion of the solvent in J mol−1.

The  for water is 1.853 K kg mol−1.

See also
 List of boiling and freezing information of solvents

References

Phase transitions
Thermodynamic properties